Phyllis D. Thompson (born October 1, 1952) is a Senior associate judge of the District of Columbia Court of Appeals.

Biography 
Thompson was born and raised in Washington, D.C. After earning a bachelor's degree in anthropology from George Washington University in 1974, she studied religion at Princeton University. She received her J.D. degree with high honors from George Washington University Law School in 1981. She then joined the law firm Covington & Burling, where she became the first African-American woman partner in 1989.

In 2006, Thompson was appointed to the D.C. Court of Appeals by President George W. Bush. Her term as Associate Judge expired on September 4, 2021.

References

External links 
 

1952 births
Living people
21st-century American judges
African-American judges
African-American women lawyers
African-American lawyers
Columbian College of Arts and Sciences alumni
George Washington University Law School alumni
Judges of the District of Columbia Court of Appeals
Lawyers from Washington, D.C.
People associated with Covington & Burling
People from Washington, D.C.
Princeton University alumni
21st-century American women judges